

Corrobinnie Hill Conservation Park is a protected area in the Australian state of South Australia located on the Eyre Peninsula in the gazetted locality of Pinkawillinie about  west of the town centre in Kyancutta.

The conservation park was proclaimed on 25 August 1983 under the state's National Parks and Wildlife Act 1972. Its name was derived from Corrobinnie Hill which is located within its boundaries.

The land surrounding the conservation park which is crown land and which is described in cadastral terms as “allotment 1 of Deposited Plan No. 33659, Hundred of Hill” was dedicated on 11 November 1993 under the Crown Lands Act 1929 as part of the conservation reserve known as the Pinkawillinie Conservation Reserve. On 21 November 2002, the surrounding land was added by proclamation to the Pinkawillinie Conservation Park.

As of 2010, the conservation park was operated in association with the Pinkawillinie Conservation Park. It can only be accessed by four-wheel drive vehicle only via the “Number 17 Stock Route.” It is reported as being “one of the most popular attractions” in the Pinkawillinie Conservation Park due to the presence of Corrobinnie Hill, a hill “consisting of unusually shaped, weathered, granite rocks.”

The conservation park is classified as an IUCN Category III protected area.

See also
Protected areas of South Australia

References

External links
Entry for Corrobinnie Hill Conservation Park on the Protected Planet website

Conservation parks of South Australia
Protected areas established in 1983
1983 establishments in Australia
Eyre Peninsula